Alexander David Simcox (born 13 December 1979) is an English former first-class cricketer.

Simcox was born at Eastbourne in December 1979. He was educated in Eastbourne at Eastbourne College, before going up to Robinson College, Cambridge. While studying at Cambridge, he made six appearances in first-class cricket for Cambridge UCCE in 2001–02, which included appearing in the sides inaugural first-class fixture against Kent. In addition to playing for Cambridge UCCE, Simcox also made a single first-class appearance for Cambridge University against Oxford University in The University Match of 2002. In six matches for Cambridge UCCE, he scored 120 runs at an average of 13.33 and a high score of 30.

Notes and references

External links

1979 births
Living people
Sportspeople from Eastbourne
People educated at Eastbourne College
Alumni of Robinson College, Cambridge
English cricketers
Cambridge MCCU cricketers
Cambridge University cricketers